February 8 Sports Club is a North Korean multi-sports club.

History 
Being established in 1959, the club belongs to the Ministry of People's Armed Forces.

The club name originated from the Korean People's Army's (KPA) date of establishment, which was formed in 8 February 1948. (Until 1977, the original KPA's official date of establishment was 8 February 1948. This change was reverted in 2018).

Confusion with April 25 Sports Club 
February 8 Sports Club and April 25 Sports Club have many similarities.

In conclusion, the North Korean Ministry of People's Armed Forces operates both sports clubs separately. The 2017 editions of the Paektusan Prize and the Mangyongdae Prize were won by April 25 Sports Club, with February 8 Sports Club finishing in second place.

Achievements

Domestic tournaments
Man'gyŏngdae Prize
Silver medal (1): 2017

Paektusan Prize
Silver medal (1): 2017

See also 
 April 25 Sports Club
 Military Foundation Day

References

Association football clubs established in 1959
Football clubs in North Korea
Multi-sport clubs in North Korea
1959 establishments in North Korea
Military association football clubs in North Korea
Military of North Korea